Macauley Chrisantus (born 20 August 1990) is a Nigerian professional footballer who plays as a striker  for Lynx.

Career
Born in Abuja, Chrisantus joined Hamburger SV in 2007 from Abuja, after attracting offers from several major European clubs, probably due to his contribution to Nigeria's World Junior Cup win that year as the highest goal scorer and second best player of the tournament. In summer 2009, he was loaned to Karlsruher SC for the 2009–10 season, but on 15 April 2010, KSC extended the loan deal for another year.

On 21 July 2014, Chrisantus signed a three-year contract with Turkish Süper Lig side Sivasspor after his two successful years at Las Palmas in Spain.

In January 2015, Chrisantus signed with Greek Side AEK Athens on an 18 months deal with an option of a further two years based on performance. On 4 October 2015, in the sixth day of the Greek Super League with eight minutes left he netted his first and winning goal against Atromitos after converting from close range. After being linked to a possible release in January, he only left the club at the end of the season, as his contract expired.

On 6 July 2016, Chrisantus signed a one-year deal with Reus Deportiu, returning to Spain two years after departing Las Palmas. On 12 September 2017 he returned to the Greek Superleague joining newly promoted side Lamia. However on 12 December 2017, after only playing in two matches he dissolved his contract with the club.

After signing for HJK Helsinki in July 2018, he left the club again at the end of the year.

International career
Chrisantus has represented Nigeria at under-17 level, and was the top scorer at the 2007 FIFA U-17 World Cup in Korea with seven goals, and was awarded the adidas Silver Ball. He scored all seven goals with his right foot.

Career statistics

Honours
AEK Athens
Football League: 2014–15 South Group
Greek Cup: 2015–16
Nigeria U17

 FIFA U-17 World Cup: 2007

Individual
FIFA U-17 World Cup Golden Shoe: 2007
FIFA U-17 World Cup Silver Ball: 2007

References

External links
 
 
 

1990 births
Living people
People from Abuja
Nigerian footballers
Association football forwards
Nigeria youth international footballers
Abuja F.C. players
Hamburger SV players
Hamburger SV II players
Karlsruher SC players
FSV Frankfurt players
UD Las Palmas players
Sivasspor footballers
AEK Athens F.C. players
CF Reus Deportiu players
Helsingin Jalkapalloklubi players
UB Conquense footballers
2. Bundesliga players
Segunda División players
Football League (Greece) players
Veikkausliiga players
Zob Ahan Esfahan F.C. players
Hetten FC players
Persian Gulf Pro League players
Saudi First Division League players
Nigerian expatriate footballers
Expatriate footballers in Germany
Expatriate footballers in Greece
Expatriate footballers in Spain
Expatriate footballers in Turkey
Expatriate footballers in Iran
Expatriate footballers in Saudi Arabia
Nigerian expatriate sportspeople in Germany
Nigerian expatriate sportspeople in Greece
Nigerian expatriate sportspeople in Spain
Nigerian expatriate sportspeople in Turkey
Nigerian expatriate sportspeople in Iran
Nigerian expatriate sportspeople in Saudi Arabia